William Poy Lee is an author and political activist currently living in Shanghai, China.  His 2007 book The Eighth Promise is a memoir about two generations of Chinese Americans, in China and Chinatown, San Francisco.

Before becoming a writer, Mr. Lee worked as an international banking attorney and an advertising executive. Mr. Lee left the professional world and has traveled, lived and taught writing in China since 2008. As a political activist, his most recent endeavor is a website about Tibet, Tibet China Accuracy Project

References

External links
Author@Google, July 1, 2008: Intifada in SF Chinatown: The first modern Chinese American Civil Rights March - Summary of '68
Author William Poy Lee Interview on NPR-KQED Forum

1951 births
21st-century American male writers
21st-century American memoirists
Activists from San Francisco
American expatriates in China
American lawyers of Chinese descent
American male non-fiction writers
American political activists
American writers of Chinese descent
Lawyers from San Francisco
Living people
PEN Oakland/Josephine Miles Literary Award winners
University of California, Berkeley alumni
University of California, Hastings College of the Law alumni
Writers from San Francisco